Matsumoto Baseball Stadium is a baseball stadium in Matsumoto, Nagano, Japan. The stadium has an all-seated capacity of 25,000.

References

Baseball venues in Japan
Sports venues in Nagano Prefecture